Park Young-tak (born 13 May 1983), credited mononymously as Young Tak (commonly stylized as YOUNGTAK), is a South Korean singer, songwriter, actor and television personality. He made his debut in 2007 as a ballad singer with his 1st album Young Tak Disia. In 2016, he started his trot career with the release of his first trot single album, Nuna You Are Perfect. In 2020, he became well known by placing second in the TV Chosun audition show Mr. Trot out of 17,000 participants with his biggest hit "Jjiniya".

Early life and education
Park was born in Mungyeong, South Korea. His father was a soldier and his mother was a civil servant who worked for telephone service. His grandfather was a music teacher and composer, who served as principal and taught music at a senior college. Park's grandfather composed many school songs for local schools in Gyeongsang-do. Park was a member of Andong MBC Children's Choir (안동MBC 어린이 합창단). He attended Yeongga Elementary School, Andong Middle School and Andong High School. Park has rhinitis, which causes nasal congestion and often interferes with his breathing. When he was in high school, Park suffered from an accident where he fell from the 3rd floor of his school building. This resulted in his ankles being broken into 30 pieces and must be fixed with screws permanently, therefore he was extempted from military service. However, Park himself wanted to finish the service, so later on he enlisted at the training center, but was still exempted from military service during the reexamination. Park is known to have majored in Advertising and Public relations at Cheongju University and completed a master's course in Practical Music Composition at Kookmin University Graduate School of Arts. He was also an adjunct professor at the Department of Applied Music at Sehan University.

Career

2004–2015: Years as a ballad singer 
In 2004, Park Young-tak entered The 1st Yeongnam Song Festival contest and won the first prize. He used the prize money (₩1,000,000) to move to Seoul and work on becoming a singer. Park started out by singing OST for the movie Marrying the Mafia II (2005). In January 2007, Park won the rookie singer contest hosted by Snow Rain Cast (Hangul: 눈비캐스트) and released his digital album 'Youngtak's DISIA' ('DISIA' is short for 'Digital Single Album') as the prize. He was recognized for his singing ability with his 1st ballad single "I Love You" (사랑한다).

In 2008, Park and Seo Dong-hoon formed a duo called Let It Be (렛잇비) and sang OST for OCN drama "My Lady Boss, My Hero". They were in the middle of preparation for their album when their agency faced difficulties. Park and Seo then joined Star King with Min Geum-yong and Lee Woo-ram as Country Kids' Soul—supposedly a parody group of Brown Eyed Soul. They won first place and a contract with a music company to debut as a four-member ballad group named L-Class (Hangul: 엘클래스) He wrote their debut song "Please Don't Go" (가지 말라고). They worked together for two years, released two singles and disbanded in 2011.

Park later became part of a ballad duo called J-Symphony (Hangul: 제이심포니 or J-심포니) with ex L-Class member Min Geum-yong (Hangul: 민금용). They released 3 singles, sang original soundtracks for dramas such as City Hunter, 49 Days, et cetera, and even had activities in Japan before part away in 2012. In the meantime, Park continued his music works by singing OSTs for cartoons, dramas and movies; singing guides for famous singers and groups such as Super Junior-H, Davichi, Park Hyoshin, SG Wannabe, and Hwanhee; writing and producing songs, and more.

In 2014, Park Young-tak and his friend Ji Kwang-min (Hangul: 지광민; stage name: MinZi (민지)) formed a multi-genre duo called Park G (Hangul: 박지, a.k.a. Park-Ji, "Park" and "Ji" are their respective last names). They release songs and work together as producers, even after Park has switched to trot.

To make a living, Park became an adjunct professor at Sehan University and voice teacher at music academies. He almost gave up his singing career as it was not a stable job. But when Park joined Hidden Singer 2 as a contestant in Wheesung's episode, his love for singing was resurrected. He decided to work on his voice and sing professionally again.

The 5 contestants in Wheesung's episode: "Love Wheesung" Kim Jin-ho, "SNU Wheesung" Park Joon-young, "Adjunct Professor Wheesung" Park Young-tak, "Trot Wheesung" Je-cheong and "Composer Wheesung" Dason, along with singer Greg Priester formed a group called Wheesung Team (Hangul: 휘성팀) or Wheeteam for short.

On January 28, 2014, they released an R&B/soul single called "Cliché" (똑같은 말) with Park G, which was composed by Park. The song was a homage to Wheesung, produced by Park and MinZi. Wheesung Team guested on shows and sang together at benefit concerts. They did charities together as well and received a testimonial from UNICEF. On 8 December 2015, Wheesung Team released their second single "We Will Get There" (너도 그렇게 걸어줘) to cheer up anyone who is pursuing their dreams. The song was written and produced by Park and Dason's group Joy O'Clock. This is also their message to each other before going on their separate ways: a promise to keep their strong friendships and be supportive of each person's lives and dreams.

2016–2020: Trot career and Appearance on Mr. Trot 
In 2016, Park Young-tak signed a contract with Milagro Entertainment and became a trot singer with the stage name "Young Tak". His CEO co-wrote his trot debut song "Nuna You're Perfect" (누나가 딱이야). He promoted his songs by working as a morning show presenter and a guest singer in singing classes for middle-aged people. His second trot single is called "We Are So Bad" (우리 정말 나쁘다 (演歌)), which received good response from the public. In the same year, he released his first trot duet and MV "Cherry Blossom Love" (사랑의 벚꽃놀이) with Sook Haeng. "Cherry Blossom Love" was given to them by a composer named Kwak Joon-young, who has written songs for Big Mama, Heesung and Naul of Brown Eyed Soul.

Young Tak wrote and produced "Why Are You Coming Out From There" (니가 왜 거기서 나와) in 2018. It is based on the true story of how Young Tak found out his girlfriend was cheating on him. He planned to give the song to his friend Young-ki, who is also a trot singer, but Young-ki said the song was too difficult for him. Jang Min-ho suggested that Young Tak sing this song himself and it became Young Tak's fourth trot single. He also choreographed and came up with the idea for the album's cover as well as the music video on his own. "Why Are You Coming Out From There" went viral in South Korea thanks to kids liking the song and using it for their TikTok videos. The "Grabbing the neck" choreography of the song also became more known by trot lovers.

Young Tak then auditioned for TV Chosun's Mr. Trot in December 2019 and got his breakthrough thanks to his cover of "A Glass of Makgeolli" (막걸리 한 잔) by Kang Jin in Mr. Trot's Mission 2 – Death Match: 1 VS 1. After the episode was aired, his cover got 1.2 million downloads in one week. Young Tak became a household name throughout South Korea and earned his nickname "Takgeolli". Then at the Semi Final - 1st Round: Individual Match (Legend Mission), he once again pulled off a flawless performance of "You Who Are Going Back To Memories" (추억으로 가는 당신) by Joo Hyun-mi - a song well-known for its complex rhythm. Young Tak received high praises from the original singer herself and all the judges, which earned him another nickname "Rhythm Tak".

In the final round of the competition, where all the top 7 finalists got to choose one totally new and original song to perform, Young Tak chose "Jjin-iya" and the song, along with the thumb dance that he choreographed himself, became Mr. Trots best hit. Young Tak came 2nd in the end and signed a 1-year and 6 months contract with New Era Project with other singers called Top 6.

2020–2021: Post-Mr. Trot

Acting and variety shows
From April 2020 to October 2021, Young Tak was a fixed cast in TV Chosun's shows Romantic Call Centre (사랑의 콜센타) and Mister Trot F4 Academy (뽕숭아학당), both have huge ratings. Young Tak is the one who has the highest one-minute footage rating that audiences watch the most in the history of Romantic Call Centre with 22.08% (according to TNMS) when he sang "A Glass of Makgeolli" in the first episode. He also guested in a lot of variety shows with the rest of Top 6.

Young Tak started gaining experience as an actor back when he starred in a musical called "The Three Generals of the Kingdom" (왕의 나라 삼태사) in 2019. In May 2020, he sang Kkondae Intern's OST "Kkondae Latte" (꼰대라떼) and had a special appearance in 3 episodes. He also played a cameo in TV Chosun's Kingmaker: The Change of Destiny.

On October 22, 2020, Young Tak and Top 6 Mr. Trot finalists appeared as main stars in the musical documentary film "Mr. Trot: The Movie", which was exclusively released by Lotte. The documentary film was a commercial success, selling more than 150,000 tickets after 3 weeks of release.

Awards as a trot singer
On October 1, 2020, Young Tak received "Rising Star Award" at 2020 Trot Awards, which was specifically selected by 108 PDs from all broadcast stations instead of fanvotes like other categories. He also performed his mega hit song "Why Are You Coming Out From There" (니가 왜 거기서 나와) as one of the celebration performances. Young Tak attracted viewers' attention with his vocal skills and bright energy.

Moreover, when Young Tak sang his hit song "Jjiniya" (찐이야) at 2020 Melon Music Awards, his performance immediately went viral on many social media platforms due to the lyrics sounding like BTS member Jin's name. The lyrics "Jin Jin Jin" trended in real time across Twitter, YouTube and Weibo. "Jin Jin Jin" ranked not only on the Twitter Trends Worldwide but also Top Twitter Trends in numerous overseas countries, including the US. Jjiniya was nominated for Best Trot Song at the award as well.

On December 30, 2020, Young Tak sang "Kkondae Latte" (꼰대라떼) and "Jjiniya" (찐이야) as celebration performance at 2020 MBC Drama Awards. Not only did Young Tak received good reactions from all the actors, actresses and viewers, but his celebration stage also recorded an audience rating of 6.5% (according to TNMS) - the highest one minute mark of the award.

Recognition as a trot composer and producer
Meanwhile, Young Tak continuously writes and produces songs for his colleagues and acquaintances, which he does mostly for free. In a span of eight months after the contest ended, he had written and produced many songs, 7 of which were officially released in 2020 and were well received. On December 5, 2020, Young Tak won the Best Songwriter Award at the Melon Music Awards. He received the Hot Trend Award (with Top 6) that night as well.

On February 10, 2021, Young Tak released his first single after Mr. Trot. The song is called "Comforter" (이불), which he wrote to "warm people's heart during a hard time". Young Tak also dedicates this song to his fandom "My People" (내사람들).

On February 25, 2021, Young Tak appeared on Miss Trot 2 not only as a guest performer, but also as one of the composers for Miss Trot 2 Final: Composer Mission. He wrote "Magnifying Glass" (돋보기)—a dance trot song inspired by the magnifying glass icon that appears when searching a portal site, which was chosen by contestant Byul Sa-rang. Her performance received the second highest score from the masters.

On April 14, 2021, Top 6 member and Mr. Trot finalist Kim Hee-jae's debut single "Follow Me" (따라따라와) was released. Composed by Young Tak and Ji Kwang-min as a gift for Heejae, "Follow Me" is said to be the first ever "disco-style Trendy Trot" song, creating a whole new genre of trot and popularizing the term "Trot idol". The song charted immediately and the reviews were positive from both critics and the public.

On July 4, 2021, Young Tak was announced to participate in the lineup for Pepsi x Starship's 2021 Pepsi Taste of Korea Campaign. It was the first time ever that a trot singer has been selected as a model for a Cola advertisement.

On July 11, 2021, Part 7 of Revolutionary Sisters original soundtrack was released, including "Okay" (오케이) performed by Young Tak. He also participated in composing and writing lyrics for this song. It ranked first on Melon's trot genre chart as soon as it was released, topped the Melon OST Hot Track and acquired high position on Korean music platforms. "Okay" won Outstanding K-Drama OST at the 16th Seoul International Drama Awards, further proving Young Tak's ability as a singer-songwriter.

On October 14, 2021, Korean press reported that Young Tak had produced a semi-trot song for the solo debut of MJ (Astro), which features singer Kim Tae-yeon from Miss Trot 2. The song is called "Get Set Yo" (계세요) and was released on November 3. With a novel combination of funk and trot, "Get Set Yo" won first place on the South Korean music program The Trot Show on November 29 and became the first trot song produced by Young Tak to do so.

2022-present: Solo activities

As a musician 
In January 2022, Young Tak became a regular cast of Channel A's "Nowadays Men's Life: Groom's Class" (요즘 남자 라이프 신랑수업). On January 31, 2022, he starred in a Lunar New Year special trot musical on KBS2 named "Thank You Everyone, Song Hae" (여러분 고맙습니다 송해), which recorded a rating of 12.7% nationwide, ranking first in its timeslot. 

On February 10, 2022, Young Tak released his first comeback single after one year called "Wanna Go Get Some Abalone" (전복 먹으러 갈래). The pop-trot song's uniqueness quickly caught attention and Young Tak was chosen to be Ambassador for Abalone of Wando County. Furthermore, when Young Tak was promoting "Wanna Go Get Some Abalone" on Cultwo Show, he was asked by the hosts and listeners to call out lottery numbers. 2 days after the radio broadcast ended, 4 out of 7 numbers called out by Young Tak matched the winning lottery ones. As a result, thousands of his fans won 4th and 3rd place (varying from ₩50,000 to ₩1,300,000), their total winnings estimated from social media posts alone exceeded tens of millions of KRW, and many people believed that the song brought them good luck. "Wanna Go Get Some Abalone" won first place on The Trot Show on March 21, 2022.

On February 14, 2022, the conservative People Power Party chose Young Tak's "Jjiniya"/"Pitiful" (찐이야) to be their campaign song for the 2022 South Korean presidential election. On March 9, 2022, candidate Yoon Suk-yeol of the conservative People Power Party won the presidential election.

On March 31, 2022, Young Tak won "Male Singer of the Year Award" at the 28th Korea Entertainment and Arts Awards.

On May 31, 2022, Young Tak's agency released a photo of his first full album 'MMM' through their official SNS channel. On June 21, 2022, it was announced that Young Tak's first solo concert 'TAK SHOW' will be held in 8 cities nationwide, starting at the Olympic Gymnastics Arena (KSPO DOME) in Seoul for 3 days from July 29 to 31st. 

On July 4, 2022, Young Tak's first full album MMM was released, which contains 12 songs of different genres such as rock, dance, pop, R&B, jazz, trot, ballad and more. He participated in the production of 9 out of 12 songs. On July 17, 2022, a special clip of "Bye Gimnyeong" (안녕김녕) - a jazz song which is also the closing track of the album - was released on his official Youtube channel. On August 8, 2022, Young Tak won "Angel N STAR Award" at 2022 The Fact Music Awards.

On October 21, Young Tak became the first Hidden Singer contestant ever to return as an original singer in the show's history. He also won against all of his impersonators in the episode. On November 20, the 5 impersonators released single "Wings" (날개), an alternative rock song which was composed by Young Tak as a gift for them.

On October 30, 2022, the TAK SHOW - Andong concert was canceled due to the aftermath of the Seoul Halloween crowd crush. 

On November 20, 2022, Young Tak completed his first solo concert successfully. 'TAK SHOW' mobilized a total of 90,000 cumulative audiences from all over the country, and returned to Seoul with a 3-day encore concert due to fans' requests and support.

On November 30, 2022, Young Tak won Grand Prize "Singer of the Year" at the 30th Korea Culture and Entertainment Awards for "Jjiniya" (찐이야). 

On December 15, 2022, Young Tak released a re-arrangement of the song "GOAT GAMIDA" (곶감이다), which he performed together with Ji Kwang-min at the EBS 'K-Story Pop Contest' back in 2014. The song's lyrics wittily tell the story of the Korean folklore 'The Tiger and the Dried Persimmon', and will be actively used in children's educational content.

On January 19, 2023, Young Tak won "Trot Award" at the 32nd Seoul Music Awards. On February 11, 2023, he won "Artist Of The Year" (Bonsang) at 30th Hanteo Music Awards. 

On March 2, 2023, Young Tak joined the lineup of SBS's Golf Battle: Birdie Buddies season 5.

As an actor 
Young Tak first started acting back in high school, performing in his classmate director Kwon Oh-kwang (권오광)'s first short film "With Burning Thirst" (타는 목마름으로) in 2000 about the Gwangju Uprising, based on a poem of the same name by poet Kim Ji-ha. On November 21, 2022, Young Tak had a special appearance in Behind Every Star as a rookie star who has gained popularity. He will make his official debut as an actor in the drama Strong Woman Gang Nam-soon in 2023.

Philanthropy 
On March 9, 2022, Young Tak donated  million to the Korean Red Cross to help the victims of  that started in Uljin, North Gyeongsang, and has spread to Samcheok, Gangwon.

On June 20, 2022, Youngtak donated 500,000 won in May to the Korea Pediatric Cancer Foundation to help children with cancer and leukemia.

Discography

Studio albums

Singles

Collaborations

Soundtrack appearances

Cartoon Soundtrack appearances

Production credits 
All song credits are adapted from the Korea Music Copyright Association (KOMCA)'s database. Young Tak often works on music with his friend Ji Kwang-min. He was named as the Songwriter of the Year at Melon Music Awards in 2020.

Filmography

Television shows

Television series

Movie appearances

Radio appearances

Ambassadorship 
 Wando Abalone ambassador (2022)

Awards and nominations

Listicles

References

External links
 

Living people
People from Andong
1983 births
Mr Trot participants
21st-century South Korean male singers
Trot singers